Conus solomonensis is a species of sea snail, a marine gastropod mollusk in the family Conidae, the cone snails and their allies.

Like all species within the genus Conus, these snails are predatory and venomous. They are capable of "stinging" humans, therefore live ones should be handled carefully or not at all.

Description
The size of the shell varies between 22 mm and 40 mm.

Distribution
Conus solomonensis occurs off the Solomon Islands and Papua New Guinea. The type locality is situated west of Honiara, Guadalcanal, Solomons.

References

 Delsaerdt A. (1992) Conus solomonensis A new species from the Solomon Islands. Gloria Maris 31(4-5): 65–72.
 Filmer R.M. (2011) Taxonomic review of the Conus spectrum, Conus stramineus and Conus collisus complexes (Gastropoda - Conidae). Part II: The Conus stramineus complex. Visaya 3(4): 4–66.
 Puillandre N., Duda T.F., Meyer C., Olivera B.M. & Bouchet P. (2015). One, four or 100 genera? A new classification of the cone snails. Journal of Molluscan Studies. 81: 1–23

External links
 The Conus Biodiversity website
 Cone Shells – Knights of the Sea
 

solomonensis
Gastropods described in 1992